Tom Clancy's Ghost Recon 2 is a tactical shooter video game developed by Red Storm Entertainment and published by Ubisoft for Xbox, PlayStation 2 and GameCube. A Microsoft Windows version was planned but cancelled in April 2005 in favor of Tom Clancy's Ghost Recon Advanced Warfighter. It is a direct sequel to the 2001 video game Tom Clancy's Ghost Recon.

The game takes place on the Korean Peninsula, with slight variations between platforms. The GameCube and PS2 campaign occurs in 2007, while the Xbox campaign is set in 2011. Ghost Recon 2 sports an updated graphics engine, the Havok 2 physics engine, new multiplayer options, and voice command ability via microphone.

Gameplay
In the single player campaign, the player assumes the role of Ghost Team leader, Captain Scott Mitchell; Mitchell is described as "a consummate soldier", being a veteran of several armed conflicts and can use weaponry from any soldier class, including assault rifles, carbines, submachine guns, sniper rifles and more. In several missions the player is inserted alone and must complete the mission without assistance from the other Ghosts. Such missions render assistance in the form of air strikes the player can call in.

Multiplayer
There are several variations of multiplayer mode in Ghost Recon 2.
Co-operative games are available in the campaign mission, battle, defend, firefight, garrison, recon, and scout modes, in which players must work together to accomplish a single goal. Garrison mode, for example, is when players must keep enemy troops out of a marked area, for a designated time.

Adversarial modes are divided into two categories; Solo, where players work separately, usually against one another, and Squad, where players are divided up into opposing teams.

Plot
The PlayStation 2 and GameCube release of the game has an entirely different plot from that of the Xbox version. It is also peripherally connected to the plot of Splinter Cell: Chaos Theory.

PlayStation 2/GameCube (2007: First Contact)
In July 2007, North Korea faces heavy turmoil as a result of famine sweeping the country. In an attempt to repair the damage, the government redirects much of the military budget to civic projects. The reappropriation of the funds angers the Korean People's Army command, causing General Jung Chong-sun to plan a coup against the government and puts the military on high alert for combat across the DMZ. Since a Silkworm missile that sank the U.S. Navy intelligence-gathering ship USS Clarence E. Walsh (CG-80) came from a North Korean missile battery, the U.S. decides to deploy the Ghosts and attack behind North Korean lines. Also during this time Sam Fisher from Third echelon is on a mission determining if the North Koreans intentionally fired the Silkworm missile. The missions include raiding a North Korean airbase, going after a downed OH-58 Kiowa transport and preventing Jung's plan to blow up a dam just upstream from the DMZ. Having dealt the North Koreans sufficient damage, Pyongyang backs down.

However, four months later, one of Jung's subordinates, General Paik, activates a Taepodong-2 missile loaded with multiple nuclear warheads and prepares to launch them against South Korea and NATO countries. The Ghosts are sent back into North Korea to destroy the missile. With the destruction of the missile, Paik commits suicide while Jung plots revenge.

Xbox (2011: Final Assault)
Having recovered from the setbacks of the first game, Jung leads the KPA in revolt once more and gains access to the North Korean nuclear arsenal. Now ready for revenge, Jung prepares to launch a new Korean War and involve other Asian countries in the chaos. NATO and the United States, plus Australia deploys a peacekeeping force to the region. The Ghosts head back to the theater for the third time and wreak havoc among the North Korean forces. Determined to fight the West and squash dissent among the North Korean populace, Jung attacks some of North Korea's largest cities, such as Sinpo and Hyesan. With the Ghosts' strikes sapping the North Koreans of fuel, Jung gets more desperate in winning the war, and in one mission, the Ghosts have to seize three nuclear warheads from a train before they reach civilian-populated areas.

Now out of options, Jung leads the capture of a dam near Hamhung and installs a nuclear warhead. The Ghosts attack once more to stop the threat and eliminate the general.

Expansion packs

Ghost Recon 2: Summit Strike
Tom Clancy's Ghost Recon 2: Summit Strike is a stand-alone expansion pack for Ghost Recon 2 available exclusively on the Xbox. Summit Strike included 11 new single-player missions, as well as new weapons (such as the FN SCAR) and an expanded multiplayer game. It was released on August 2, 2005.

Reception

By the end of 2004, after seven weeks of availability, Ghost Recon 2 had sold 1.4 million copies.

Ghost Recon 2 was met with positive (Xbox) to very mixed reception (PS2 and Gamecube). GameRankings and Metacritic gave it a score of 82.67% and 80 out of 100 for the Xbox version; 63.34% and 58 out of 100 for the PlayStation 2 version; and 48.67% and 54 out of 100 for the GameCube version.

The game was criticized by the North Korean government for its storyline.

References

External links
Official Ghost Recon website

2004 video games
Cancelled Windows games
Censored video games
GameCube games
Multiplayer and single-player video games
PlayStation 2 games
Red Storm Entertainment games
Tom Clancy games
 02
Ubisoft games
Unreal Engine games
Video games developed in the United States
Video games scored by Bill Brown
Video games scored by Tom Salta
Video games set in 2007
Video games set in 2011
Video games set in North Korea
Video games using Havok
Video games with expansion packs
Xbox games